The Phillip Island Bridge is an arch bridge in Victoria, Australia, that connects the mainland with Phillip Island.

History
On 29 November 1940, a suspension bridge opened between San Remo on the mainland and with Newhaven on Phillip Island. The 540 metre bridge had two lanes but no footpaths, instead having six pedestrian refuges. The main span was 168 metres long. The cables had previously been used on a bridge on Sydney's North Shore. Because of weight restrictions, tourist coaches had to offload their passengers.

In April 1966, a contract was awarded to John Holland for a replacement bridge made from reinforced concrete. It opened on 21 November 1969.

References

External links

Bridges completed in 1969
Concrete bridges in Australia
Phillip Island
Road bridges in Victoria (Australia)
1969 establishments in Australia